Cyrus Rad (born July 10, 1999) is an American professional soccer player who currently plays for Huntsville City FC in MLS Next Pro.

Early career
Cyrus Rad was born and raised in Durham, North Carolina, playing high school soccer for Charles E. Jordan High School and youth soccer for North Carolina Fusion.

College career
Rad played college soccer for North Carolina State University, attending from 2017 to 2021 and being awarded ACC Academic Honor Roll honors. He made three appearances for the Wolfpack during his time at NC State.

Club career

Forward Madison
Rad joined Forward Madison on August 12, 2021 during the 2021 season and made his professional debut in USL League One on August 21 against North Texas SC. He provided his first assist of the 2022 season on May 21, 2022 against Charlotte Independence, maintaining 91% pass accuracy and being subsequently named in the Team of the Week. On October 17, 2022, Rad was named to his fifth Team of the Week within the 2022 season.

Personal life
Rad is of Iranian descent and is the brother of Jahon and Kaveh Rad.

Honors

Individual
ACC Academic Honor Roll: 2018, 2019

References

1999 births
Living people
American soccer players
Iranian footballers
Forward Madison FC players
Association football defenders
Soccer players from North Carolina
USL League One players
USL League Two players
MLS Next Pro players
Sportspeople of Iranian descent
American people of Iranian descent
Rad family
People from Durham, North Carolina
NC State Wolfpack men's soccer players